Lundey (Icelandic: , "Puffin Island") is a small, uninhabited island in Skjálfandi bay located about  from Húsavík, in northern Iceland. It is the smaller of two islands in the bay, the other being Flatey.
Its name in Icelandic means "Puffin"; over 200,000 Atlantic Puffin breed on the island's cliffs in the summer hence its name.

History
Though uninhabited, Lundey is privately owned and there are multiple structures on the island including a lighthouse.

Environment
Skjálfandi bay is an excellent place for fishing, especially for cod and lumpfish. Arctic Skua and Northern Fulmar are common around Lundey during the Summer in addition to the nesting Puffins there.   
Many of the whale watching tours departing from Húsavík sail past the island to showcase the breeding birds there. Humpback Whales and Pilot Whales are also often sighted nearby.

There are two other islands known as Lundey in Iceland: one in Skagafjörður fjörd in north Iceland and another in the southwest near Reykjavík.

External links
General information about Lundey Island.

References

Islands of Iceland